Sören-Kurt Reddemann (born 16 May 1996) is a German professional footballer who plays as a centre back for Hallescher FC.

References

External links
 
 

1996 births
Living people
People from Zwenkau
German footballers
Footballers from Saxony
Association football defenders
RB Leipzig II players
SV Wehen Wiesbaden players
Chemnitzer FC players
Hallescher FC players
Regionalliga players
3. Liga players